Martina Zvěřinová (née Dočkalová, born 22 July 1983) is a Czech orienteering competitor. She won a silver medal with the Czech relay team at the 2011 World Orienteering Championships in Chambéry.

She is Junior World Champion from 2003.

References

External links
 
 Martina Zverinova at World of O Runners

1983 births
Living people
Czech orienteers
Female orienteers
Foot orienteers
World Orienteering Championships medalists
Sportspeople from Pardubice
Junior World Orienteering Championships medalists